In Greek mythology, Iphitos or Īphitus (Ancient Greek: Ἴφιτος) was an Oechalian prince and one of the Argonauts.

Family 
Iphitus was the son of King Eurytus of Oechalia and Antiope or Antioche, and thus brother to Iole, Toxeus, Deioneus, Molion, Didaeon and Clytius, also an Argonaut. He was a descendant of Oxylus.

Mythology 
It is told that after Heracles finished his Twelve Labours, he came to Oechalia to compete in archery for the hand of Iole; he won and yet he was refused the bride by Eurytus and his sons (except Iphitus who said that Iole should be given to Heracles), on the ground that he could once more kill his offspring as he had done to his children by Megara. Shortly after some cattle were stolen by the notorious thief Autolycus, and Heracles was held responsible; but Iphitus did not believe it and, having gone to meet him, he invited him to seek the cattle with him. Heracles promised to do so but suddenly he went mad again and he threw Iphitus from the walls of Tiryns, killing him. According to one version of the myth, Iphitus is also said to have been a lover of Heracles.

During his search for the cattle, Iphitos met Odysseus in Messenia, befriended him, and gave Odysseus his father Eurytus's bow. It was this bow that Odysseus used to kill the suitors who had wanted to take his wife, Penelope.

Notes

References 

 Apollonius Rhodius, Argonautica translated by Robert Cooper Seaton (1853-1915), R. C. Loeb Classical Library Volume 001. London, William Heinemann Ltd, 1912. Online version at the Topos Text Project.
 Apollonius Rhodius, Argonautica. George W. Mooney. London. Longmans, Green. 1912. Greek text available at the Perseus Digital Library.
 Diodorus Siculus, The Library of History translated by Charles Henry Oldfather. Twelve volumes. Loeb Classical Library. Cambridge, Massachusetts: Harvard University Press; London: William Heinemann, Ltd. 1989. Vol. 3. Books 4.59–8. Online version at Bill Thayer's Web Site
 Diodorus Siculus, Bibliotheca Historica. Vol 1-2. Immanel Bekker. Ludwig Dindorf. Friedrich Vogel. in aedibus B. G. Teubneri. Leipzig. 1888-1890. Greek text available at the Perseus Digital Library.
 Gaius Julius Hyginus, Fabulae from The Myths of Hyginus translated and edited by Mary Grant. University of Kansas Publications in Humanistic Studies. Online version at the Topos Text Project.
 Homer, The Odyssey with an English Translation by A.T. Murray, PH.D. in two volumes. Cambridge, MA., Harvard University Press; London, William Heinemann, Ltd. 1919. Online version at the Perseus Digital Library. Greek text available from the same website.
 Pseudo-Apollodorus, The Library with an English Translation by Sir James George Frazer, F.B.A., F.R.S. in 2 Volumes, Cambridge, MA, Harvard University Press; London, William Heinemann Ltd. 1921. Online version at the Perseus Digital Library. Greek text available from the same website.
 Publius Papinius Statius, The Thebaid translated by John Henry Mozley. Loeb Classical Library Volumes. Cambridge, MA, Harvard University Press; London, William Heinemann Ltd. 1928. Online version at the Topos Text Project.
 Publius Papinius Statius, The Thebaid. Vol I-II. John Henry Mozley. London: William Heinemann; New York: G.P. Putnam's Sons. 1928. Latin text available at the Perseus Digital Library.

Princes in Greek mythology
Argonauts
Male lovers of Heracles
Mythology of Heracles